Ivan Tasev (born 21 March 1967) is a Bulgarian volleyball player. He competed in the men's tournament at the 2008 Summer Olympics.

References

1967 births
Living people
Bulgarian men's volleyball players
Olympic volleyball players of Bulgaria
Volleyball players at the 2008 Summer Olympics
Sportspeople from Pazardzhik